The Archdiocese of Dubuque is a Latin Church ecclesiastical territory or archdiocese of the Catholic Church in the northeastern quarter of the state of Iowa in the United States.

It includes all the Iowa counties north of Polk, Jasper, Poweshiek, Iowa, Johnson, Cedar, and Clinton counties, and east of Kossuth, Humboldt, Webster and Boone counties.

The Archdiocese of Dubuque is a metropolitan archdiocese. There are three suffragan dioceses in the ecclesiastical province under Dubuque's metropolitan archbishop: the Dioceses of Davenport, Des Moines, and Sioux City.

Background
The seat of the archdiocese is St. Raphael's Cathedral, Dubuque, named in honor of the Archangel Raphael.

The twelfth and current archbishop is Michael Owen Jackels.

Jackels completed a Doctorate in Sacred Theology at the Pontifical University of Saint Thomas Aquinas, Angelicum in Rome in 1989.

On April 4, 2005, he was consecrated bishop of the Roman Catholic Diocese of Wichita, USA.

The Archdiocese of Dubuque is one of only a handful of US archdioceses not based in a major metropolitan area.  The archdiocese contains 199 parishes and has three Catholic colleges: Loras College and Clarke University in Dubuque and Mount Mercy University in Cedar Rapids. A number of religious orders maintain a presence in the archdiocese.

Notable orders include the Trappist monastery New Melleray Abbey (male) southwest of Dubuque, and the Trappistine monastery Our Lady of the Mississippi Abbey (female) south of Dubuque. The archdiocese is also home to the motherhouse of the Sisters of Charity of the Blessed Virgin Mary.

History

Prior to the founding
During the years prior to the founding of the Dubuque Diocese, the area was under the jurisdiction of a number of bishops.  Many of these were purely academic as no Catholic presence yet existed in the area.  Most notable among these was the St. Louis Diocese under Bishop Rosati.  During the early 1830s it was under his jurisdiction that the early missionaries arrived in what would become the state of Iowa.

In the 1830s, the church studied how to address the expansion of the United States into the western frontiers.  Those conducting the study recommended to the pope that three new dioceses be created, one of which was the Dubuque Diocese. Father Charles Fitzmaurice established the Saint Raphael's parish at Dubuque in 1833.  This was the first church of any Christian denomination in the territory that would become the state of Iowa.

Samuel Charles Mazzuchelli was one of the most famous missionaries to work in the Dubuque area.  He established a number of parishes in Iowa, Illinois, and Wisconsin; several were named after the Archangels: Saint Raphael's in Dubuque, Saint Michael's at Galena, Illinois, and Saint Gabriel's at Prairie du Chien, Wisconsin.  Pope John Paul II declared Father Mazzuchelli Venerable in 1993, and his case for sainthood is pending.

Early years
Pope Gregory XVI created the Dubuque Diocese on July 28, 1837, and named Bishop Mathias Loras as its first bishop.  Loras gathered funds and personnel for the new diocese, and he arrived in 1839. St. Raphael's became the cathedral parish in August of that year. He oversaw the expansion of the church in the early years of the diocese, first in the Iowa territory, then after 1846 in the new state of Iowa.

Bishop Loras encouraged immigration to the area, especially German and Irish settlers. He oversaw the creation of new parishes and also he invited several religious orders to the area. This included the Cistercian order that built the New Melleray Monastery south of Dubuque. Shortly before his death, he directed the construction of the third structure to house St. Raphael's Cathedral which remains today.

A second catholic parish was planned as the Uptown Catholic Parish to be located on the west side of Main Street between 7th and 8th streets in Dubuque. Loras planned the parish due to crowded conditions at the Cathedral. A cornerstone was laid for the parish church, but construction work never proceeded past the laying of the foundation. In 1850, Pope Pius IX separated territory from the Diocese of Dubuque to form the new Diocese of Saint Paul, serving Minnesota Territory (later Minnesota and the Dakotas).

Expansion and elevation
In 1858, Bishop Smyth established Saint Francis Catholic Church in Balltown. Rev. Clement Smyth, OCSO served as bishop from February 1858 to September 1865  and oversaw continued expansion of the Catholic Church in the diocese.  During his episcopacy the German Catholics of the city of Dubuque began construction of a new Saint Mary's church to replace the too-small Church of the Holy Trinity.

In 1863, Smyth learned of the existence of the pro-Southern Knights of the Golden Circle, with headquarters in Dubuque. He gave members who might be Catholic two weeks to withdraw from the organization or be automatically excommunicated.

After Bishop Smyth died in 1865, John Hennessey succeeded him as Bishop of Dubuque.  During Hennessey's tenure, the population of Dubuque exploded as the Milwaukee Railroad Shops came to the city.  Hennessey created several parishes in Dubuque: Sacred Heart, Holy Ghost, St. Anthony's, and Holy Trinity to deal with this population explosion. During this time, Bishop Hennessey proposed separating territory from the diocese to create a new diocese for southern Iowa.  While he proposed Des Moines as the seat of the new diocese, Pope Leo XIII selected Davenport as the site.

Nicholas E. Gonner (1835–1892), a Catholic immigrant from Luxembourg, founded the Catholic Publishing Company of Dubuque. His son Nicholas E. Gonner (1835–1892) took over in 1892, editing two German language weeklies, an English language weekly, and the Daily Tribune, the only Catholic daily newspaper ever published in the United States.

On June 15, 1893, Pope Leo XIII elevated the Dubuque Diocese to an archdiocese, and Bishop Hennessey became the first archbishop.  Archbishop Hennessey died in 1900 and was buried at the cathedral.

Early 20th century
After the death of Archbishop Hennessey, Archbishop John J. Keane led the archdiocese for eleven years until poor health forced him to retire in 1911.  During his tenure, the archdiocese lost its western territory to form the Diocese of Sioux City and achieved its current size.

The Great Depression and World War II
During the years of the Great Depression and World War II, Archbishop Francis J.L. Beckman occupied the see. In the years leading up to the war, Beckman opposed military action. A collector of fine art pieces, he had placed a number of art pieces in a museum at Columbia (now Loras) College and perhaps, thinking he could gain funds to further his collection, involved the archdiocese in what turned out to be a dubious gold mine scheme. Beckman signed notes on behalf of the archdiocese, which suffered a loss of more than $500,000 when the scheme fell apart and the perpetrator of the scheme (Phillip Suetter, of California) was arrested. President Roosevelt directed the FBI to investigate Beckman to determine his role in the financial scheme. Most of Beckman's collection was sold to pay the notes.

Because of Beckman's troubles, Bishop Henry Rohlman returned from the Davenport, Iowa, diocese to become coadjutor archbishop in 1944. Beckman was allowed to retain his office, but was informed that Rohlman now led the archdiocese. Beckman retired in 1947, and left Dubuque for Cincinnati.

On December 7, 1941, Japan bombed Pearl Harbor. One of the casualties in that attack was Father Aloysius Schmitt, a priest of the archdiocese, who was serving on board the USS Oklahoma.  The boat capsized during the attack, leaving Schmitt and other men trapped below with only a small porthole for escape. Schmitt declined to be pulled from the ship, and instead helped other men, twelve in all, to escape, but perished himself. Schmitt was the first chaplain of any denomination to die in World War II. For his actions, he was awarded the Navy and Marine Corps Medal, and a destroyer was named in his honor.

Postwar era
Soon after the war, Admiral Byrd led an expedition to the Antarctica. The chaplain on his flagship, Fr. William Menster, was a priest of the Archdiocese of Dubuque. Menster became the first priest to set foot on the continent, and later consecrated Antarctica in 1947. One of the effects of the post-war baby boom was an increase in the number of students at some Catholic schools.  In Dubuque, the Sacred Heart parish school had the largest student population of such schools in the midwest.  On December 2, 1954, Archbishop Leo Binz succeeded Archbishop Rohlman as Archbishop of Dubuque and served in that capacity until December 16, 1961, when he became Archbishop of Saint Paul, Minnesota.

Second Vatican Council and the aftermath
James Byrne was named the next archbishop of Dubuque on March 7, 1962, and was formally installed at St. Raphael's on May 8, 1962.  He attended all four sessions of the Second Vatican Council.  Archbishop Byrne implemented the changes brought about by the council in the Archdiocese of Dubuque and quickly established the Priests Senate, a clergy advisory board, as well as another advisory board dealing with assignment of priests. These were among the first such boards founded in the United States. Archbishop Byrne retired from office on August 23, 1983, and remained in Dubuque until his death August 2, 1996.

Late 20th-early 21st centuries
On February 23, 1984, Daniel William Kucera, OSB, was installed as the tenth bishop and eighth archbishop of Dubuque.  Archbishop Kucera had earned a doctorate in education.  At 36, he had become the youngest president of St. Procopius College (now known as Benedictine University).  His background in education led Vatican officials, including the pope, to seek his advice.

During Kucera's tenure as archbishop, he remodeled St. Raphael's Cathedral, revised and published the guidelines for the sacrament of Confirmation, reduced the number of deaneries from 16 to 14, reorganized the structure of the archdiocese and created an archbishop's cabinet to coordinate administration of the archdiocese.

In 1987, Kucera also launched a plan that divided the archdiocese into three regions with a resident bishop in each. The Dubuque Region was served by retired Archbishop James Byrne and Archbishop Kucera; the Cedar Rapids Region by Bishop Francis Dunn, and Waterloo Region by Fr. William Franklin who was consecrated as a bishop in April 1987. However, Bishop Kucera eventually dropped the plan after the death of Bishop Dunn in 1989 and Bishop Franklin's nomination as the head of the Diocese of Davenport.

In 1986 the archdiocese celebrated the 150th anniversary of its founding; Archbishop Kucera received an honorary degree from the University of Dubuque.  On October 16, 1995, Archbishop Kucera retired, moved to Aurora, Colorado, and then subsequently returned to live in Dubuque.

Bishops

Bishops of Dubuque
 Mathias Loras (1837–1858)
 Clement Smyth, OCSO (1858–1865)
 John Hennessey (1866–1893), elevated to Archbishop

Archbishops of Dubuque
 John Hennessey (1893–1900)
 John Keane (1900–1911)
 James Keane (1911–1929)
 Francis Beckman (1930–1946)
 Henry Rohlman (1946–1954; Coadjutor 1944–1946)
 Leo Binz (1954–1961), appointed Archbishop of Saint Paul and Minneapolis
 James Byrne (1962–1983)
 Daniel Kucera, OSB (1983–1995)
 Jerome Hanus, OSB (1995–2013; Coadjutor 1944–1995)
 Michael Owen Jackels (2013–present)

Auxiliary bishops
 Edward Aloysius Fitzgerald (1946–1949), appointed Bishop of Winona
 Loras Thomas Lane (1951–1956), appointed Bishop of Rockford
 George Biskup (1957–1965), appointed Bishop of Des Moines and later Coadjutor Archbishop and Archbishop of Indianapolis
 Loras Joseph Watters (1965–1969), appointed Bishop of Winona
 Francis John Dunn (1969–1989)
 William Edwin Franklin (1987–1993), appointed Bishop of Davenport

Other priests of this diocese who became bishops
Joseph Crétin, appointed Bishop of Saint Paul in 1850
 Jean-Antoine-Marie Pelamourgues, appointed Bishop of Saint Paul in 1858; did not take effect
Henry Cosgrove (priest here, 1857–1881), appointed Bishop of Davenport in 1884
Thomas Mathias Lenihan, appointed Bishop of Cheyenne in 1896
Mathias Clement Lenihan, appointed Bishop of Great Falls in 1904
John Patrick Carroll, appointed Bishop of Helena in 1904 (he was born in Dubuque, but was a priest of Cleveland before he became a bishop)
Daniel Mary Gorman, appointed Bishop of Boise in 1918
Thomas William Drumm, appointed Bishop of Des Moines in 1919
Edward Howard, appointed Auxiliary Bishop of Davenport in 1923 and later Archbishop of Oregon City
Louis Benedict Kucera, appointed Bishop of Lincoln in 1930
Joseph Clement Willging, appointed Bishop of Pueblo in 1941
James Vincent Casey, appointed Auxiliary Bishop of Lincoln in 1957
Raymond Philip Etteldorf, appointed Apostolic Delegate to New Zealand in 1968 and later an official of the (Vatican) Secretariat of State
Justin Albert Driscoll, appointed Bishop of Fargo in 1970
Thomas Zinkula, appointed Bishop of Davenport in 2017
William Michael Joensen, appointed Bishop of Des Moines in 2019

Recent events

Sexual abuse crisis

The Dubuque Archdiocese has not been immune to the sexual abuse crisis affecting the church, but has had to deal with cases involving a couple dozen priests over a 60-year period.

Priest shortage
The archdiocese has also felt the effects of the priest shortage that has affected the church in recent times. In recent years many smaller, rural parishes have had to close and their congregations had been absorbed into other nearby parishes. Some rural parishes have been clustered together where one priest will serve two or more parishes. Some parishes have no resident priest.

Another effect is that some duties that a priest would have performed in the past are performed by either religious (sister or deacon) individuals, or by the laity.

Education issues
In recent years, many questions have been raised about the future of Catholic schools.  With parishes closing or combining services, schools were also combined together.  In recent times, schools in a given geographical area have all been joined together into a school system.

In Dubuque, the Catholic schools are all part of the Holy Family system. There has been much controversy recently about how to best run the schools. The administrators of the system had recently made plans to reorganize the schools. This was due to factors such as a declining number of students attending Catholic schools. An especially controversial move that was proposed was to turn St. Anthony's school into a central school for certain grades. Parents of the parish felt that their concerns were being ignored.  Eventually, the Archdiocesan Board of Education vetoed the plan, and told the school system to continue work on planning the system's future.

Controversy over The Passion of the Christ
The Mel Gibson film The Passion of the Christ caused controversy in the archdiocese as well. That controversy has long since passed. One of the main issues raised by the film was an editorial cartoon on the movie that the Dubuque Telegraph-Herald published in its editorial section. This cartoon featured a religious sister using corporal punishment. Some in the community have felt that this was a slight against the sisters and all their years of hard work.  Others, mainly middle age to older adults, have said that this was representative of the sisters who taught them while they were in school.

Early parishes

Saint Francis Catholic Church
Saint Francis Catholic Church is located in Balltown. As of 2006, the church did not have a resident pastor.  The parish is part of a cluster of several other rural parishes in northern Dubuque County, Iowa, that share a pastor and other facilities.

The parish traces its history back to 1858. A number of area residents had petitioned Bishop Mathias Loras to establish a Catholic parish in the Balltown area. Loras came to the area and offered Mass in a log cabin near Balltown. Residents gathered the funds to build a church and school.

In 1891, local resident Andreas Rapp and his wife donated some land, which allowed for the construction of a brick building containing a school and a convent for the sisters, as well as the establishment of a cemetery.  The school opened in September of that year with 45 children attending. Another local resident, Peter Cremer, donated land for a new church, and in 1892 the cornerstone for the second St. Francis Church building was laid.

The second St. Francis Church building would serve the parish until August 27, 1976, when lightning struck the steeple, causing a fire which destroyed the church building. In the aftermath a new St. Francis Church was constructed, while the old convent building was torn down to make room for the new church.

Saint John the Baptist Catholic Church
Saint John the Baptist Catholic Church is located in Peosta on Sundown Road, just to the north of U.S. Highway 20.  The church building is a newer structure, having been built in the late 1980s.  As a result, it reflects some of the more recent trends in the church, including having the congregation arranged in a semicircle around the altar.

Currently, the pastor of St. John the Baptist Church is Father Richard Kuhn, who also covers Holy Family Catholic Church located about three miles away. The offices for both parishes are located at St. John's.  The archdiocese has indicated that when Fr. Kuhn retires this arrangement will probably be changed due to the priest shortage, and St. John's would be clustered with several other nearby parishes. The parish has recently grown to the point where it is considering expanding or replacing the current church building.

Saints Peter and Paul Catholic Church

Saints Peter and Paul Catholic Church is the parish for the Dubuque County town of Sherrill.  It is part of a cluster of rural parishes that share a pastor and other facilities.

History

The parish was founded in 1852 as St. William's. Prior to this, residents living in the Sherrill area needed to travel to Dubuque about 15 miles away to attend Mass, a considerable distance at the time.  In response to the need for a local church to accommodate the heavy German Catholic immigration to the rural districts surrounding Sherrill, Dubuque Bishop Mathias Loras established the parish.

By the 1860s the name of Saints Peter and Paul had been adopted, and in 1889 the original wooden church was replaced by a large, brick and stone Romanesque Revival structure, which remains in use today. During the 1970s, the church's original carved wood altars were removed and its 19th-century wood trim was painted over. Recently parish members completed a renovation of the building that restored the wood trim and added decorative details suggestive of its past. Inscriptions on the church's stained glass windows and on the older headstones in its adjoining cemetery are in German, reflecting the culture of the parish's founding members.

For well over 100 years the parish school was operated by the Franciscan Sisters of Perpetual Adoration (FSPA) of La Crosse, Wisconsin, and many girls of the parish who felt a calling to religious life joined that order. The school is still operated on the premises of the parish by the Archdiocese of Dubuque, as a consolidation of the original school and the Catholic school which once served the nearby community of Balltown, Iowa.

Other
Other early parishes in the diocese include Saint Mary's, Sacred Heart, Holy Ghost, and Saint Anthony's.

Schools

High schools

Seminaries
 St. Pius X Seminary
 Divine Word Seminary

Colleges and universities
 Loras College, Dubuque
 Clarke University, Dubuque
 Mount Mercy University, Cedar Rapids
 Divine Word College, Epworth

Suffragan sees

 Roman Catholic Diocese of Davenport
 Roman Catholic Diocese of Des Moines
 Roman Catholic Diocese of Sioux City

References

Sources
 Hoffman, Rev, Mathias M., Centennial History of the Archdiocese of Dubuque, Columbia College Press, Dubuque, Iowa, 1938.

External links
 
 

 
Dubuque, Iowa
Dubuque
Religious organizations established in 1837
Dubuque
1837 establishments in Wisconsin Territory
Religion in Dubuque, Iowa